David Beatty, 3rd Earl Beatty (born 21 November 1946) is a British peer and photographer. Known from birth by the courtesy title of Viscount Borodale, in 1972 he succeeded his father as Earl Beatty and gained a seat in the House of Lords, but rarely attended.

Early life
The son of David Beatty, 2nd Earl Beatty, and his second wife Dorothy Furey, he is also a grandson of the former First Sea Lord David Beatty, 1st Earl Beatty, and was educated at Eton College.

Career
On 10 June 1972 he succeeded his father in his peerages.

As a photographer, Beatty has worked in the British Isles and in Africa.

Personal life
In 1971 Beatty married firstly Anne Please; they were divorced in 1983, having had two sons:

 Sean David Beatty, Viscount Borodale (born 1973)
 Peter Wystan Beatty (born 1975)

In 1984, Beatty married secondly Anoma Corinne Wijewardene. They were divorced in 1997.

Notes

David
Earls in the Peerage of the United Kingdom
1946 births
Living people
People educated at Eton College
British photographers